Tepuihyla shushupe is a frog in the family Hylidae.  Scientists know it exclusively from the site of collection: The headwaters of the rivers Ere and Campuya near the Colombia border within Peru.  They collected the sample 145 meters above sea level.

Morphology

The adult male frog measures about 85.4 mm long in snout-vent length and the adult female frog about 85.7 mm.  The iris of the eye is whitish in color with red around the outside.  The skin of the dorsum is light green and the ventrum yellow-green.  The skin is granular, with dark brown color on the back of each granule.  Parts of the legs are whitish in color and parts are yellow-green.  This frog has fringed skin on all four legs.

Habitat

This frog lives in terrace habitats thick with leaf litter, many tree roots, and small swamps.  When scientists caught the first holotype male, it was sitting in a hole in a tree.

Etymology

The scientists named this frog shushupe after vernacular name of the snake Lachesis muta in the language of the local indigenous people.  There is a common belief that the snake can sing or otherwise vocalize.  The scientists consider it possible that people have been hearing the vocalizations of Tepuihyla shushupe and attributing them to the snake.

References

Frogs of South America
Tepuihyla
Amphibians described in 2018